Alexis Chivás Hechavarría (also Alexei or Alexey; born 7 November 1983 in Santiago de Cuba; another source reports 1 December 1983) is a Cuban decathlete. His personal best score is 7956 points, achieved in March 2008 in Havana. He also became Cuban champion in 2005.

Personal best
Decathlon 7956 pts –  Havana, 8 March 2008

Achievements

References

External links
Tilastopaja biography

1983 births
Living people
Cuban decathletes
Central American and Caribbean Games gold medalists for Cuba
Sportspeople from Santiago de Cuba
Central American and Caribbean Games medalists in athletics
Competitors at the 2006 Central American and Caribbean Games